Jonaswalde is a municipality in the Thuringian district of Altenburger Land.  It belongs to the Verwaltungsgemeinschaft of Oberes Sprottental.

Geography

Neighboring municipalities
Nearby municipalities are Heukewalde, Thonhausen, and Vollmershain in the district of Altenburger Land; Rückersdorf in the district of Greiz; as well as the city of Crimmitschau in the Saxon district of Zwickauer Land.

Municipal arrangement
The community is divided into two subdivisions: Jonaswalde and Nischwitz.

History
From 1826 to 1920, Jonaswalde was part of Saxe-Altenburg.

References

External links
 a private website from Jonaswalde
 FOSAVIS, a private website from Dirk Salomon, Jonaswalde

Altenburger Land
Duchy of Saxe-Altenburg